"Long Haired Lover from Liverpool" is a pop song best known as a hit for Little Jimmy Osmond. Written by Christopher Kingsley (credited as Christopher Dowden on the UK release) and produced by Mike Curb and Perry Botkin Jr, "Long Haired Lover from Liverpool" was a UK number one single for Jimmy Osmond. Riding high on the popularity of the Osmonds, Jimmy (the youngest sibling) had a massive hit with the song, in the process becoming the youngest person to ever reach number one on the UK Singles Chart aged 9 years 8 months.

A UK number one for five weeks in December 1972, it was the Christmas number one that year, and has since sold over a million copies in the UK.  It also reached number two on the Australian Singles Chart (Kent Music Report) and number 38 on the US, Billboard Hot 100.

The song was first recorded by the writer and released in 1969. Kingsley's recording was an unsuccessful single although it was played by a popular MOR station, KMPC, in Los Angeles.

However, Kingsley's record was distributed by MGM, the record label the Osmonds recorded for, and that was how Jimmy's mother first heard "Long Haired Lover From Liverpool". She thought it would be a great song for the youngest member of the Osmond family. Mike Curb, president of MGM and producer of the Osmonds agreed and recorded Jimmy. The timing could not have been better, as Osmond-mania was sweeping the UK and the Osmond family was embarking on a major UK-European promotional tour. Politics at the UK record company almost stopped the record from being released as a single, but through the efforts of Virgin Ear Music (a Richard Kaye Publishing Company - worldwide copyright owner of "Long Haired Lover From Liverpool") and his UK sub-publishers the Little Jimmy Osmond record was released.

Charts

References

UK Singles Chart number-one singles
Irish Singles Chart number-one singles
1972 singles
Pinky and Perky songs
Songs about Liverpool
MGM Records singles